In linear and homological algebra, a monad is a 3-term complex

 A → B → C

of objects in some abelian category whose middle term B is projective and whose first map A → B is injective and whose second map B → C is surjective. Equivalently, a monad is a projective object together with a 3-step filtration (B ⊃ ker(B → C) ⊃ im(A → B)). In practice A, B, and C are often vector bundles over some space, and there are several minor extra conditions that some authors add to the definition.

See also

ADHM construction

References

Vector bundles
Homological algebra